Lydia Boylan (born 19 July 1987) is an Irish racing cyclist, who competes in the track and road disciplines of the sport. Boylan won the Irish National Road Race Championships in 2015, 2016 and 2017.

She competed for Northern Ireland at the 2014 Commonwealth Games in Glasgow, where she finished 21st in the women's road race, 14th in the scratch race and 16th in the points race. She is eligible to represent Northern Ireland through her mother. She rode at the 2015 UCI Track Cycling World Championships.

Personal life
Outside of cycling, Boylan is a qualified engineer, graduating with a bachelor's degree in Civil Engineering from University College Dublin in 2008 and a master's degree in Earthquake Engineering from Imperial College London in 2010. Since November 2013 she has combined her cycling career with teaching at the University of Nottingham's School of Architecture.

Major results
Source: 

2015
 1st  Road race, National Road Championships
2016
 1st  Road race, National Road Championships
2017
 1st  Road race, National Road Championships
 1st  Scratch, National Track Championships
 1st Stage 4 Setmana Ciclista Valenciana
 2nd  Madison, UEC European Track Championships (with Lydia Gurley)
 6th Overall Six Days of London
2nd Scratch
2nd Madison (with Katie Archibald)
2018
 1st  Omnium, National Track Championships
2019
 2nd  Points race, UCI Track Cycling World Championships
2022
 1st Mallorca 167

References

External links

1987 births
Living people
Irish female cyclists
Irish track cyclists
Sportspeople from Dublin (city)
Cyclists at the 2019 European Games
European Games competitors for Ireland
Cyclists at the 2014 Commonwealth Games
Cyclists at the 2018 Commonwealth Games
Commonwealth Games competitors for Northern Ireland
21st-century Irish women